Pierre Larsen (born 22 January 1959) is a former footballer who played as a midfielder.

References

External links
 

1959 births
Living people
Association football midfielders
F.C. Copenhagen players
Hvidovre IF players
Grasshopper Club Zürich players
Danish men's footballers
Denmark international footballers
Footballers from Copenhagen